Tristan Vizcaino (born July 31, 1996) is an American football placekicker for the Dallas Cowboys of the National Football League (NFL). He signed with the Cincinnati Bengals as an undrafted free agent in 2019 following his college football career at Washington. He has also been a member of the Minnesota Vikings and the San Francisco 49ers.

College career
Vizcaino attended the University of Washington from 2014 to 2017, playing football as a kicker and punter. His most significant action came in 2017, where he made twelve field goals. He went undrafted in the 2018 NFL Draft.

Professional career

Cincinnati Bengals (first stint)
Vizcaino attended a rookie minicamp tryout with the New York Jets in May 2018, but did not sign with the team. He signed a reserve/futures contract with the Cincinnati Bengals on January 1, 2019. He was waived on August 30, 2019.

Dallas Cowboys
Vizcaino remained unsigned during the 2019 NFL season, but signed a Reserve/Futures contract with the Dallas Cowboys on January 21, 2020. He was waived on April 22.

Cincinnati Bengals (second stint)
Vizcaino re-signed with the Bengals on August 1, 2020, and was waived again on August 26.

Minnesota Vikings
Vizcaino was signed to the Minnesota Vikings' practice squad on November 21, 2020. He was released on December 15.

San Francisco 49ers
Vizcaino was signed to the San Francisco 49ers' practice squad on January 1, 2021. He was elevated to the active roster the next day for the team's week 17 game against the Seattle Seahawks to kick in place of Robbie Gould, who was in COVID-19 protocols, and reverted to the practice squad after the game. Vizcaino made his NFL debut in the game, making all three of his attempted field goals. His practice squad contract with the team expired after the season on January 11, 2021.

Buffalo Bills
Vizcaino was signed to the Buffalo Bills' practice squad on January 23, 2021. His practice squad contract with the team expired after the season on February 1, 2021.

Los Angeles Chargers
On March 5, 2021, Vizcaino signed with the Los Angeles Chargers. He won the starting kicker job over Michael Badgley to begin the season. However, Vizcaino was waived on October 26, 2021, after missing a league-high five extra point attempts through the season's first seven weeks. He was later re-signed to the practice squad.

New England Patriots
Vizcaino signed with the New England Patriots on June 10, 2022. He was waived on August 30, 2022. He was re-signed to the practice squad on September 21. He was released on November 1.

Arizona Cardinals

On November 12, 2022, Vizcaino was signed to the Arizona Cardinals active roster. He was waived on November 15.

New England Patriots (second stint)
On November 21, 2022, Vizcaino signed with the practice squad of the New England Patriots.

Dallas Cowboys (second stint)
On January 18, 2023, Vizcaino was signed to the Dallas Cowboys' practice squad. He was re-signed on February 22, 2023.

References

External links
Washington bio
San Francisco 49ers bio

1996 births
Living people
Players of American football from California
American football placekickers
Washington Huskies football players
San Francisco 49ers players
Sportspeople from San Bernardino County, California
Buffalo Bills players
Los Angeles Chargers players
People from Chino Hills, California
New England Patriots players
Arizona Cardinals players
Dallas Cowboys players